Henri Hanlet (11 September 1888 – 2 September 1964) was a Belgian racing cyclist. He won the Belgian national road race title in 1910. The previous year he finished in 8th place in 1909 Paris–Roubaix.

References

External links

1888 births
1964 deaths
Belgian male cyclists
Sportspeople from Liège
Cyclists from Liège Province